Paris Exposition or Paris Exhibition can refer to
 French Industrial Exposition of 1844
 Exposition des produits de l'industrie française, held intermittently from 1798 to 1849
 Exposition Universelle (1855), the Paris Exposition of 1855
 Exposition Universelle (1867), the Paris Exposition of 1867
 Exposition Universelle (1878), the Paris Exposition or Paris World's Fair of 1878
 Exposition Universelle (1889), the Paris Exposition of 1889
 Exposition Universelle (1900), the Paris Exposition of 1900
 International Exposition of Modern Industrial and Decorative Arts, the Paris Exposition of 1925
 Paris Colonial Exposition, the Paris Exposition of 1931
Exposition Internationale des Arts et Techniques dans la Vie Moderne, the Paris Exposition of 1937